Peter Monaghan (1917 – 21 January 1945) was a Scottish professional footballer who played in the Football League for Bournemouth & Boscombe Athletic as a wing half.

Personal life
Monaghan was married and served as a private in the Glasgow Highlanders of the Highland Light Infantry (City of Glasgow Regiment) during the Second World War. He was killed in the Netherlands on 21 January 1945 and was buried in Sittard War Cemetery.

Career statistics

References

1917 births
Date of birth missing
1945 deaths
Footballers from North Ayrshire
Association football wing halves
Scottish footballers
English Football League players
AFC Bournemouth players
Dundee United F.C. wartime guest players
Kilmarnock F.C. wartime guest players
Glasgow Highlanders soldiers
20th-century Scottish military personnel
British Army personnel killed in World War II
People from Stevenston
Scottish military personnel killed in action